CacheFly is a content delivery network (CDN) provider based in Chicago, Illinois with a 100% remote team. In 1999 CacheFly started as Downloadhosting.com for file distribution for small software developers, by CTO, Matt Levine.

The CacheFly service was launched in March 2005.

In 2016 despite limited marketing or sales efforts CacheFly crossed 15,000 hostnames, growing primarily through word of mouth from existing customers. That same year CacheFly launched advanced media services with progressive downloads, adaptive streaming, transcoding, and transmuxing as added capabilities.

With analytics becoming a major growth market CacheFly launched a new advanced analytics dashboard in 2018, with a major face-lift again in 2021.

2020 saw major growth for digital companies, including CacheFly. The company began focusing on peering routes to work towards a healthier internet in the face of the global digital migration.

Major companies and organizations known to be using CacheFly
Ars Technica
 Various podcasts on the TWiT network 
OverDrive
ROBLOX
PluralSight
GameStop
SkillSoft

See also

 Anycast
 Content Delivery Network

References

Content delivery networks
Internet technology companies of the United States
Internet properties established in 2002
Companies based in Chicago
2002 establishments in Illinois